The National Front (in Czech: Národní fronta, in Slovak: Národný front) was political coalition created in 1943 serving as united front of political parties for liberation of Czechoslovakia, after 1948 organized solely by the Communist Party of Czechoslovakia. it was the vehicle for control of all political and social activity by the Communist Party of Czechoslovakia (KSČ). It was also known in English as the National Front of Czechs and Slovaks.

1943–1948 
As World War II began, Czechoslovakia disappeared from the map of Europe. The Czech lands became the Protectorate of Bohemia and Moravia under direct Nazi rule, while Slovakia ostensibly became independent. At the end of World War II, Czechoslovakia was included in the sphere of influence of the Soviet Union. Postwar Czechoslovakia was organized according to a program worked out by the KSČ (whose leaders were in exile in Moscow), and Edvard Beneš, representing the government-in-exile in London—these being the two most important groups seeking the reconstitution of the country. Part of the program was the formation of a popular anti-Nazi coalition of parties. Negotiations began in December 1943 in Moscow. The KSČ and the non-Communist parties had very different ideas about this.

This coalition was established as the "National Front" in April 1945, when a Czechoslovak government came into being in the city of Košice, recently liberated by Soviet troops. The model of government was adopted from similar French tripartisme.
 
The Slovak People's Party was banned due to its collaboration with the Nazis. The government decided not to allow the re-creation of other pre-war democratic parties, such as the Republican Party of Farmers and Peasants, due to its lead of the Party of National Unity.

The National Front was dominated by the socialist parties: KSČ (which held key ministerial officies), KSS and ČSSD.

The Communists viewed the National Front as a permanent entity, while the remaining parties considered it a temporary coalition until normal conditions would arise in Czechoslovakia. Many quarrels arose between the KSČ and the remaining parties of the National Front in the transitory period 1945–1948.

Political parties (1943–1948)

1948–1990 
The KSČ definitively seized power in Czechoslovakia on 25 February 1948.  The other parties were quickly purged of their more courageous elements, and also dropped their original ideologies.  The Front took on a character similar to similar alliances in the Communist bloc.  All member parties accepted the "leading role" of the KSČ as a condition of their continued existence.

After the 1948 coup, the member parties were:

 Communist Party of Czechoslovakia (KSČ), incorporated also the ČSSD in June 1948
 Communist Party of Slovakia (CPS), merged with the KSČ in September 1948
 Czechoslovak People's Party (ČSL)
 Czechoslovak Socialist Party (ČSS), which had dropped "National" from its name
 (Slovak) Freedom Party (SSL)
 Party of Slovak Revival (SSO) (a pro-Communist reincarnation of the Democratic Party)

The nonsocialist members of the Front were allowed to maintain their existence in order to keep up the appearance of pluralism. However, the KSČ held all real power; no one could take part in the political process without KSČ approval.

The other parties were structured just like the Communists, with a secretariat, central committee, and Presidium. Despite their actual impotence and subservience, they retained significant memberships through the entire Communist era. In 1984, the CPP had about 66,000 members, and the CNSP had about 17,000 members. Voters were presented with a single list of National Front-approved candidates, which was usually approved by margins of well over 99 percent against fewer than one percent who either rejected the list or cast blank or spoiled ballots. Non-KSČ candidates were represented, but seats were allocated in accordance with a set quota that guaranteed a large Communist majority.

In 1969, the country was re-organized as a federation of the Czech Socialist Republic and Slovak Socialist Republic. Separate National Front organizations for each federal component were set up, which nominated candidates for the Czech National Council and Slovak National Council.

In other Communist states, there were similar coalitions with identical names (in East Germany) or similar names, (Poland, Bulgaria, and Vietnam).

Political parties (1948–1990)

Other civil organizations

After the 1948 coup, the National Front was converted into a broad-based patriotic organization that controlled nearly all organized activity in the country, excluding only religion.  Thus the Front was extended to include mass organizations that were not political parties.  Among the other member organizations which were made full members were:

 Revolutionary Trade Union Movement (to which all unions belonged)
 Socialist Union of Youth (1.5 million members)
 Union for Czechoslovak-Soviet Friendship
 Czechoslovak Union of Women (1 million members)
 Czechoslovak Red Cross
 Union of Agricultural Cooperatives
 Union of Anti-Fascist Fighters
 Svazarm (Union for Cooperation with the Army)
 National Peace Committee
 Physical Culture Association
 Union of Philatelists

All these groups were given the standard Communist organization, and Party members held all controlling positions in these, even as they did not send elected deputies to parliament. This ensured that no secular organization could exist wholly independent of KSČ leadership.  These groups permeated workplaces, schools, and neighborhoods. As with the Front, many of these organizations added Czech and Slovak regional components in 1969 and after.

End of the National Front
After the Velvet Revolution of 1989 ended Communist rule, the National Front was dissolved.

Electoral history

National Assembly elections

House of the People and House of Nations elections

See also 

 Polish Committee of National Liberation/Front of National Unity
 Politics of Communist Czechoslovakia
 Vietnamese Fatherland Front
 National Front
 Fatherland Front
 People's Democratic Front/Front of Socialist Unity and Democracy
 United Front
 Democratic Front for the Reunification of the Fatherland
 Lao Front for National Construction
 National United Front of Kampuchea

Further reading
Kaplan, Karel. Pět kapitol o Únoru. Brno: Doplněk, 1997, .

References

Political party alliances in Czechoslovakia
Popular fronts of communist states